Ozarba propera is an owlet moth (family Noctuidae). The species was first described by Augustus Radcliffe Grote in 1882.

The MONA or Hodges number for Ozarba propera is 9031.

References

Further reading

External links
 

Eustrotiinae
Articles created by Qbugbot
Moths described in 1882